The  is a complex located in Amagasaki, Japan. The building, which opened in 1975, has three concerts halls. The "Archaic Hall" is the largest and seats 2,030 people. Notable past performers include Roger Daltrey, Yes, The Smashing Pumpkins, INXS, Santana and Alcatrazz.

References

External links

 

Concert halls in Japan